The Tragedy of a Great is a 1920 German silent historical film directed by Arthur Günsburg and starring Carl de Vogt, Sybill Morel, and Wilhelm Diegelmann. It is a biopic of the life of the painter Rembrandt.

The film's sets were designed by the art director Bernhard Schwidewski.

Cast
In alphabetical order

References

Bibliography

External links

1920 films
Films of the Weimar Republic
Films directed by Arthur Günsburg
German silent feature films
1920s historical films
German historical films
Films set in the 17th century
Films about Rembrandt
Films set in the 1640s
Films set in the 1650s
Films set in the 1660s
Films set in the Netherlands
Films set in Amsterdam
German black-and-white films
1920s German films